This is a list of Cree and Naskapi territories in Quebec It includes only Cree and Naskapi villages and village municipalities. All places with the exception of Kawawachikamach and Kawawachikamach (Naskapi village municipality)  are in the territory of Eeyou Istchee.

See also
Indigenous peoples in Quebec
List of Indian reserves in Quebec
List of Indian settlements in Quebec
List of northern villages and Inuit reserved lands in Quebec

References

 
Indian reserves
Indian, Quebec
Naskapi